Shawn Mark Tolleson (born January 19, 1988) is an American former professional baseball relief pitcher. He played in Major League Baseball (MLB) for the Los Angeles Dodgers and Texas Rangers.

High school and college
Tolleson played High School baseball at Allen High School in Allen, Texas. A four-year letter winner for head coach Paul Pool, he led Allen to regional quarterfinals as sophomore and regional semifinals as junior. Both seasons Tolleson was chosen THSCA All-State, 1st-Team All-District and All-Area. Posted 9–2 with 0.42 ERA and 137 strikeouts in 89 innings as sophomore and went 7–4 with 0.89 ERA and 112 strikeouts in 80 innings as junior for the co-District Champion Allen Eagles. Came into his senior season as a First-team 2006 preseason All-America by Collegiate Baseball, but missed most of senior season due to Tommy John surgery.

While at Baylor University, Tolleson compiled a 9–13 record in 2008-2010 after being redshirted as a freshman in 2007. He saw his most success as a Freshman going 6–4 in 14 starts and having a team-high two complete game shutouts. Named an honorable mention All-Big 12 selection in 2008 and 2010, he was also awarded Big 12 Pitcher of the Week honors twice in his college career. In 2008, he played collegiate summer baseball in the Cape Cod Baseball League for the Yarmouth-Dennis Red Sox, and returned to the league in 2009 with the Chatham Anglers.

Professional career

Los Angeles Dodgers
Tolleson was drafted by the Los Angeles Dodgers in the 30th round of the 2010 MLB Draft out of Baylor University. In 2010 with the Ogden Raptors, he had 17 saves in 25 appearances and a 0.63 ERA. He was selected to the Pioneer Baseball League post-season All-star team. In 2011, he appeared in 14 games with the Great Lakes Loons, five with the Rancho Cucamonga Quakes and 38 with the AA Chattanooga Lookouts. He was the primary closer at each level, working in 57 total games with a 7–2 record, 1.17 ERA and 25 saves. He was the Dodgers Minor League Pitcher of the Year in 2011. After beginning 2012 with Chattanooga, he was promoted to the AAA Albuquerque Isotopes on May 11.

Tolleson was called up to the majors for the first time on June 4, 2012. He made his Major League debut on June 7 against the Philadelphia Phillies. He walked the two batters he faced, throwing eight balls in 10 pitches and was quickly taken out of the game. He did better in his second appearance, on June 10 against the Seattle Mariners, working one inning and picking up his first two strikeouts. During the 2012 season, he appeared in 40 games for the Dodgers with an ERA of 4.30 and a 3-1 record.

Tolleson began the 2013 season in Albuquerque, where he pitched 5.2 innings in 3 games with 2 saves and did not allow any runs. He was called up to the Dodgers on April 12 and pitched that day, walking the only two batters he faced. He was placed on the disabled list after the game and underwent surgery on April 25 to repair a herniated disc in his back. His return from the injury was hampered when he suffered a hip injury during his minor league rehab in August. He was shut down for the season.

Texas Rangers
On November 20, 2013, he was claimed off waivers by the Texas Rangers. He became the Rangers closer in 2015. He recorded his first career save on May 20, 2015 against Boston in a 2-1 victory after Neftali Feliz was waived after not performing well enough in the closer role. He finished the season with a 6-4 record, 2.99 ERA, a 1.15 WHIP, 35 saves and 76 strikeouts. On May 18, 2016, Tolleson was removed as closer by the Rangers after owning an ERA over 9 despite recording 11 saves.

On October 27, 2016, Tolleson rejected an outright assignment and became a free agent.

Tampa Bay Rays
On January 23, 2017, Tolleson signed a one-year, $1 million contract with the Tampa Bay Rays. He was outrighted to Triple-A on November 6, 2017, and later elected free agency.

Return to Texas
On December 22, 2017, Tolleson signed a minor league contract with the Texas Rangers.

After experiencing a setback in his rehab from Tommy John surgery, Tolleson announced his retirement on January 16, 2019.

References

External links

Baylor Bears bio

1988 births
Living people
Los Angeles Dodgers players
Texas Rangers players
Baylor Bears baseball players
Ogden Raptors players
Great Lakes Loons players
Rancho Cucamonga Quakes players
Chattanooga Lookouts players
Albuquerque Isotopes players
Arizona League Dodgers players
Round Rock Express players
Major League Baseball pitchers
Baseball players from Dallas
Yarmouth–Dennis Red Sox players
Chatham Anglers players
People from Allen, Texas